The Liaoning Provincial Museum (Chinese: trad. , simp. , Liáoníngshěng Bówùguǎn) is a prominent museum of history and fine arts located in Shenyang, the capital of China's Liaoning province.

History
The institution was founded as the Northeast Museum by the Northeast People's Government and opened on July 7, 1949. It was renamed the "Liaoning Provincial Museum" in 1959. In July 2003, it moved to a new, specially-designed building on the east side of Government Square in Shenyang.

Collections
The permanent collections include:
 the Dawn of Chinese Culture Gallery: archaeological exhibits related to the Hongshan and Xinle cultures
 the Northern Shang and Zhou Period Gallery: bronze tools and weapons
 the Bei Shan Tang Tablet Gallery: Chinese steles
 the Ancient Chinese Currency and Coins Gallery
 the Art Work Exhibition of the Ming and Qing Dynasties Gallery, including Prosperous Suzhou
 the Chinese Post-Unification Gallery: tomb relics

Visit
The museum is open from 9  to 5 , except on Mondays. The museum is closed to the public on Mondays and during the public holiday for Chinese New Year. Entry is free.

References

Museums in Liaoning
Buildings and structures in Shenyang
Museums established in 1949
National first-grade museums of China
1949 establishments in China